Kildonan—St. Paul is a federal electoral district in the Winnipeg Capital Region of Manitoba, Canada. It has been represented in the House of Commons of Canada since 2004.

Geography
It consists of the far northern end of Winnipeg and the rural municipalities of East St. Paul and West St. Paul.

Demographics
14.4% of the riding's residents are of Polish ethnic origin, the highest such percentage for any Canadian federal riding.

History
This riding was created in 2003 from Winnipeg North—St. Paul, Winnipeg North Centre and a small part of Winnipeg—Transcona riding.

This riding lost territory to Winnipeg North and Elmwood—Transcona during the 2012 electoral redistribution.

Members of Parliament

Current Member of Parliament
Its Member of Parliament is Raquel Dancho, a member of the Conservative Party of Canada.

Election results

See also
 List of Canadian federal electoral districts
 Past Canadian electoral districts

References

Notes

External links
 
 Expenditures - 2008
Expenditures - 2004

Manitoba federal electoral districts
Kildonan, Winnipeg
Politics of Winnipeg